Minjavan-e Gharbi Rural District is in Minjavan District of Khoda Afarin County, East Azerbaijan province, Iran. At the National Census of 2006, its population was 4,378 in 931 households, when it was in the former Khoda Afarin District of Kaleybar County. There were 4,214 inhabitants in 1,063 households at the following census of 2011, by which time Khoda Afarin District had risen to the status of a county and divided into three districts. At the most recent census of 2016, the population of the rural district was 4,094 in 1,282 households. The largest of its 42 villages was Asheqlu, with 534 people.  There is a significant decline in the population, which is a reflection of a general trend in the Arasbaran region due to the lack of jobs.

History
In the wake of White Revolution (early 1960s) many clans of  Mohammad Khanlu Tribe  used the north  part of the district  as their winter quarters. The tribe's summer quarters were located in the mountains of the southern part, which include prime pastures. The district's population was in steady decline since the launch of land reform policies in the early 1960s. By 2000 some villages, for instance Garmanab, were already abandoned.  Some expatriates, working as painters in Tehran, returned  and built summer residences. At present the district is witnessing an unprecedented construction boom, a fact that can be easily noticed by comparing the included photos, both taken from Abbasabad respectively in 2009 and 2014.

References 

Khoda Afarin County

Rural Districts of East Azerbaijan Province

Populated places in East Azerbaijan Province

Populated places in Khoda Afarin County